Plandište is a village and municipality located in the South Banat District of the autonomous province of Vojvodina, Serbia. The village has a population of 3,832, while Plandište municipality has 11,336 inhabitants. One of municipality's best known landmarks is Kapetanovo Castle, located in Stari Lec.

Name

The name of the village derived from the word plandovati used in the local Serbian dialect, which in modern standard Serbian means odmarati, and in English means to rest.

History

World Politics running over Banat for centuries 
Banat as part of Pannonia was under Roman rule from 9 BC to the end of the fourth century. In the fifth century, the Huns razed the land. In the ninth century, the Hungarian empire started its reign, and around 1000 AD the Banat became part of the prospering Hungarian empire. In the thirteenth century Genghis Khan invaded Europe. After the Battle of Mohács in 1526, the Turks took over two-thirds of Hungary, including Banat.

Settlements before Zichydorf 
In the municipal area of Plandište have been several places in medieval times: Bioseg, Terjan, Sarkac and Raros. These names still exist on 18th-century maps.

According to Milleker there were several different villages named Bioseg between 1375 and 1550. They were named O-Belzeg, Nagy-Belzeg und Pervan-Belzeg. The names mean:

 Prefix bel- or bio- comes from Serbian belu which means white (compare to Belgrade / Beograd).
 -zeg comes from Hungarian sziget meaning island.
 Pervan is Serbian and means first, which is common at that time and area to distinguish different places of the same name: simply give numbers.
 Milleker does not tell anything about O-. Maybe it is nothing more than a guess: in German it is common to abbreviate Ober with O- meaning the village located on higher altitude.
 Nagy is Hungarian and means big.

What happened to the villages during the reign of the Ottoman is unknown. When the Hungarians came back, of those villages only a few houses and the names were left.

Milleker talks about a legend, that at the today location of Plandište there had been a battle between Prince Eugene and the Ottoman Empire during the Great Turkish War (1683-1699) most likely around 1686 (TODO check). What remained was a graveyard, which was discovered in 1889 during the erection of the train line from Zrenjanin to Margita. He suggests that Romanian Shepherds founded Morminț which means cemetery in Romanian and thus might refer to exactly this battle and graveyard.

The fact is, in 1713 the village Morminț existed at the location of Plandište with a count of 23 houses. After the Austro-Turkish War (1716–1718), it counted only 8. In 1738 the Ottoman Turks struck back, destroying settlements along the Danube, including Morminț. The Turks advanced north over the next year, all the way to Temesvar, the capital of Banat. After this invasion, the territory around Morminț was abandoned.

Austrians driving back the Ottoman 
The Austrians and Hungarians joined forces and in 1738 pushed the Turks back south, across the Danube. The expulsion of the Turks brought organized settlement under the auspices of the Habsburg dynasty. Austro-Hungarian military campaigns were based on German nobility - Counts, who served as generals to the Imperial Austrian Army. It was custom for the Austrian Kaiser to reward each count with a piece of land from the newly conquered Banat. So Count Carl Zichy de Vásonkeö, at that time president of the Hungarian Parliament (check! Milleker calls it "Kammer", maybe https://de.wikipedia.org/wiki/Hofkammer), became the owner of about 10,000 acres (check, usually they counted in Austrian Katastraljoch which is 0.57 ha) of land in the Plandište area. Since he did not earn much money from the lease of this land he decided to take part in the colonization effort.

Colonizing the Conquered Land 
In 1782 Emperor Joseph II started the third colonization into Banat which ended in 1787. Later, in winter 1787 and spring 1788 the colony Zichydorf was established. So they settled it with people from German Banat villages instead: Grabaț, Jimbolia (Hatzfeld), Comloșu Mic (Ostern), Iecea Mică (Klein-Jetscha) and Iecea Mare (Groß-Jetscha). The new settlement consisted of 123 houses owning 34 Katastraljoch (19.5 ha) each.

In 1867 Austria adopted a dual monarchy known as the Austro-Hungarian Empire. The Hungarian authorities later forced Magyarization to create a special Hungarian nation from a mixed population, which was mostly German, but also included Hungarians, Romanians, Serbs, Turks and several other ethnics. Magyarization resulted in the name change from German to Hungarian. So Zichydorf was renamed to Zichyfalva or Zichyhaza. Also, the Hungarians built a lot of infrastructure like railroads and the Danube–Tisa–Danube Canal.

Modern times 
After the Treaty of Versailles in 1918 the new borders brought Zichyfalva into the state of Serbia, which became part of the newly formed Kingdom of Yugoslavia. Alexander I of Yugoslavia proclaimed the change of all place names to Serbian and so it was named Mariolana.

During the German occupation in the Second World War the names of the settlements were returned to the German original names. Afterwards the place got its present name Plandište. The German population was expelled under harsh conditions, many being send to Russian work camps and Serbian concentration camps. Immigrants from other parts of the country arrived on the territory of the municipality, so that 18 ethnicities were represented in the again multi-ethnic population structure.

Inhabited places
Plandište municipality includes the following villages:
Plandište
Banatski Sokolac
Barice
Velika Greda
Veliki Gaj
Dužine
Jermenovci
Kupinik
Laudonovac
Margita
Markovićevo
Miletićevo
Stari Lec
Hajdučica

Demographics
Historical population of the village:

Ethnic groups
Municipality

According to the 2011 census, the municipality of Plandište had a total population of 11,336, including:

5,868 Serbs (51.76%)
1,280 Hungarians (11.29%)
1,042 Macedonians (9.19%)
784 Romanians (7.92%)
616 Slovaks (5.43%)
281 Romani (2.48%)
1,465 Others and undeclared (12.92%)

Settlements with Serb ethnic majority are: Plandište, Banatski Sokolac, Velika Greda, Veliki Gaj, Dužine, Kupinik, Laudonovac, Markovićevo, Miletićevo, and Stari Lec. The settlement with Romanian ethnic majority is Barice. The settlement with Hungarian ethnic majority is Jermenovci. Ethnically mixed settlement with relative Serb majority is Margita. Ethnically mixed settlement with relative Slovak majority is Hajdučica.

Village

See also
List of places in Serbia
List of cities, towns and villages in Vojvodina
Municipalities of Serbia
South Banat District
Geschichte der Gemeinde Zichydorf by Johann Achtzehner

References

Gallery

 
Populated places in Serbian Banat
Populated places in South Banat District
Municipalities and cities of Vojvodina
South Banat District
Macedonian communities in Serbia